Lepidium dictyotum is a species of flowering plant in the mustard family known by the common names alkali pepperweed and alkali pepperwort.

It is native to the far western United States. It grows in dry saline and alkaline soils, such as dry lakebeds.

Description
Lepidium dictyotum is a hairy annual herb producing decumbent or spreading stems up to about 20 centimeters long. They are lined sparsely with small leaves divided into fingerlike lobes.

The inflorescence is a mostly erect raceme of tiny flowers. Each flower is made up of millimeter long sepals and occasionally a white petal, although the petals are usually absent.

The fruit is a dehiscent silique 3 or 4 millimeters long divided into two valves, each containing a seed.

References

External links
Photo gallery: Lepidium dictyotum var. acutidens
Photo gallery: Lepidium dictyotum var. dictyotum

dictyotum
Flora of Baja California
Flora of California
Flora of Idaho
Flora of Nevada
Flora of Oregon
Flora of Utah
Flora of Washington (state)
Flora of the Cascade Range
Flora of the California desert regions
Flora of the Great Basin
Natural history of the California chaparral and woodlands
Natural history of the Central Valley (California)
Natural history of the Mojave Desert
Natural history of the Peninsular Ranges
Natural history of the San Francisco Bay Area
Natural history of the Transverse Ranges
Plants described in 1868
Flora without expected TNC conservation status